A dessert is typically the sweet course that, after the entrée and main course, concludes a meal in the culture of many countries, particularly Western culture. The course usually consists of sweet foods, but may include other items. The word "dessert" originated from the French word desservir "to clear the table" and the negative of the Latin word servire. There are a wide variety of desserts in western cultures, including cakes, cookies, biscuits, gelatins, pastries, ice creams, pies, puddings, and candies. Fruit is also commonly found in dessert courses because of its natural sweetness. Many different cultures have their own variations of similar desserts around the world, such as in Russia, where many breakfast foods such as blini, oladyi, and syrniki can be served with honey and jam to make them popular as desserts.

By type

Brand name desserts

A
 Angel Delight
B
 Bird's Custard
 Bompas & Parr
 Butter Braid
C
 Cherrybrook Kitchen
 Chicoo
 Cool Whip
 Coppenrath & Wiese
D
 Dr. Oetker
 Dream Whip
E
 Eli's Cheesecake
 Entenmann's
J
 Jell-O
 Jell-O 1-2-3
M
 Milky (pudding)
 Mrs. Wagner's Pies
 My-T-Fine
Y
 YoGo

Cakes

Cake is a form of bread or bread-like food. In its modern forms, it is typically a sweet baked dessert. In its oldest forms, cakes were normally fried breads or cheesecakes, and normally had a disk shape. Modern cake, especially layer cakes, normally contain a combination of flour, sugar, eggs, and butter or oil, with some varieties also requiring liquid (typically milk or water) and leavening agents (such as yeast or baking powder).

A
 Allahabadi cake
 Allerheiligenstriezel
 Amandine
 Angel cake
 Angel food cake
 Apple cake
 Arany galuska
B
 Babka
 Banbury cake
 Bánh
 Bánh bò
 Bánh chuối
 Bánh da lợn
 Bánh khoai mì
 Bánh tét
 Battenberg cake
 Baumkuchen
 Berlingozzo
 Better than sex cake
 Bibingka
 Bika Ambon
 Birthday cake
 Bizcocho
 Black bun
 Black Forest cake
 Blackout cake
 Blondie
 Bolo Rei
 Brownie
 Buccellato
 Buckwheat gateau
 Bulla cake
 Bundt cake
 Butter cake
 Butterkuchen
C
 Cake balls
 Cake pop
 Caraway seed cake
 Carrot cake
 Cassata
 Castella
 Chantilly cake
 Charlotte
 Cheesecake
 Chelsea bun
 Chiffon cake
 Chocolate cake
 Chokladboll
 Chongyang Cake
 Chorley cake
 Christmas cake
 Coconut cake
 Coffee cake
 Cupcake
 Cupcone
D
 Dacquoise
 Depression cake
 Devil's food cake
 Dirt cake
 Doberge cake
 Dobos torte
 Donauwelle
 Dundee cake
E
 Eccles cake
 Eggies
 Eierschecke
 Erotic cake
 Esterházy torte
F
 Fat rascal
 Financier
 Flourless chocolate cake
 Foam cake
 Frankfurter Kranz
 Friand
 Frog cake
 Fruitcake
 Funing big cake
G
 Garash cake
 Genoa cake
 Genoise
 German chocolate cake
 Gingerbread
 Gingerbread house
 Gooey butter cake
 Groom's cake
 Gugelhupf
H
 Happy Cake
 Heavy cake
 Herman cake
 Hot milk cake
 Hummingbird cake
I
 Ice cream cake
 Imagawayaki
J
 Jaffa Cakes
 Jewish apple cake
 Joffre cake
K
 Kalathappam
 Kek Lapis Sarawak
 Kentucky jam cake
 Kyiv cake
 King cake
 Kladdkaka
 Kornigou
 Kouign-amann
 Kransekake
 Kuchen
 Kue cubit
L
 Ladyfinger
 Lamington
 Lane cake
 Lardy cake
 Layer cake
 Lekach
 Linzer torte
M
 Madeira cake
 Madeleine
 Malt loaf
 Marble cake
 Mazurek
 Međimurska gibanica
 Molten chocolate cake
O
 Ontbijtkoek
 Opera
P
 Pain d'épices
 Pandan cake
 Panforte
 Panettone
 Panpepato
 Parkin
 Parrozzo
 Pastiera
 Petit four
 Pinca
 Ploatz
 Pound cake
 Prekmurska gibanica
 Princess cake
 Prinzregententorte
 Punschkrapfen
 Put chai ko
Q
 Queen cake
R
 Red bean cake
 Red velvet cake
 Rigó Jancsi
 Rock cake
 Rosca de reyes
 Rum baba
 Rum cake
 Ruske kape
S
 Sachertorte
 Šakotis
 Šampita
 Sesame seed cake
 Sfouf
 Sheet cake
 Simnel cake
 Snack cake
 Sno Balls
 Song gao
 Spanische Windtorte
 Spekkoek
 Spice cake
 Sponge cake
 St. Honoré cake
 Stack cake
 Stollen
 Streuselkuchen
 Swiss roll
T
 Tahinopita
 Taiyaki
 Tarta de Santiago
 Tea loaf
 Teacake
 Tin roof pie
 Tipsy cake
 Tiramisu
 Torta alla Monferrina
 Torta caprese
 Torta de nata
 Torta della nonna
 Torta delle rose
 Torta Maria Luisa
 Torta Tre Monti
 Torte
 Tottenham cake
 Tres leches cake
 Tu
 Tula pryanik
 Tunis cake
 Tunnock's teacake
U
 Upside-down cake
W
 Wacky cake
 Wafer
 Waffle
 Wedding cake
 Welsh cake
 White sugar sponge cake
 Wine cake
Y
 Yule log
Z
 Zuger Kirschtorte
 Zwetschgenkuchen

Confectionery and candies

Confectionery is related to the food items that are rich in sugar and often referred to as a confection. Candy is a confection made from a concentrated solution of sugar in water, to which flavorings and colorants may be added. Candies come in numerous colors and varieties and have a long history in popular culture.
 Candy (category)

Confectionery

A
 Abnabat
 Akanés
B
 Besan barfi
 Bonbon
 Bourbon ball
 Brittle
 Bubble gum
 Buckeye candy
 Bulk confectionery
 Butterscotch
C
 Cajeta
 Calisson
 Candied fruit
 Candy
 Candy apple
 Candy cane
 Candy cigarette
 Candy corn
 Candy pumpkin
 Caramel
 Caramel apple
 Caramel corn
 Catànies
 Cezerye
 Chewing gum
 Chikki
 Choco pie
 Chocolate
 Chocolate balls
 Chocolate bar
 Chocolate-coated peanut
 Chocolate-covered coffee bean
 Chocolate-covered raisin
 Chocolate truffle
 Churchkhela
 Cocadas
 Coconut candy
 Comfit
 Cordial
 Cotton candy
 Cuberdon
D
 Divinity
 Dodol
 Dominostein
 Dragée
 Dulce de leche
E
 Edible ink printing
F
 Fālūdhaj
 Fondant
 Fruit sours
 Fudge
G
 Gajak
 Gaz
 Geplak
 Gibraltar rock
 Glaze
 Gobstopper
 Gozinaki
 Gulab Jamun
H
 Halva
 Hanukkah gelt
 Hard candy
 Haw flakes
I
 Imarti
 Ischoklad
J
 Jelly bean
 Jordan almonds
K
 Ka'í Ladrillo
 Kaju Katli
 Kakinada khaja
 Kamarcut
 Karah Parshad
 Kesaria Peda
 Kettle corn
 Konfyt
 Konpeitō
 Kosereva
L
 Lacabòn
 Laddu
 Lakhamari
 Lemon drop
 Liquorice
 Liquorice allsorts
M
 Mampostial
 Manjar
 Maple sugar
 Maple taffy
 Marron glacé
 Marshmallow
 Marshmallow creme
 Marzipan
 Mendiant
 Milk chocolate
 Mint
 Misri
 Modjeska
 Mooncake
 Moustalevria
 Mozartkugel
N
 Noghl
 Nonpareils
 Nougat
O
 Oblaat
 Orange jelly candy
P
 Paçoca
 Pashmak
 Pastila
 Pastille
 Peanut butter cup
 Pecan log roll
 Penuche
 Pepero
 Persipan
 Pirate coins
 Pirulín
 Pocky
 Polkagris
 Pontefract cake
 Poolaki
 Ptasie mleczko
Q
 Queijadinha
R
 Ribbon candy
 Rock
 Rock candy
 Rocky road
 Royal icing
 Rum ball
 Russian candy
S
 Salt water taffy
 Salty liquorice
 Sandesh
 Sesame seed candy
 Sherbet (powder)
 Singori
 S'more
 Sohan
 Soor ploom
 Sprinkles
 Spunk
 Stick candy
 Strela candy
 Succade
 Sugar cake
 Sugar mice
 Sugar paste
 Sugar plum
 Suikerboon
 Sukhdi
 Szaloncukor
T
 Tableting
 Tarasari
 Teja
 Throat lozenge
 Tiffin
 Tooth-friendly
 Turkish delight
 Turrón
Z
 Zefir

Cookies

In the United States and Canada a cookie is a small, flat, baked treat, usually containing flour, eggs, sugar, and either butter or cooking oil, and often including ingredients such as raisins, oats, or chocolate chips.

A
 Ammonia cookie
B
 Bizcochito
 Black and white cookie
 Butter cookie
 Butter pecan
C
 Canestrelli
 Caycay
 Chocolate chip cookie
 Christmas cookies
 Colaz
 Cookie dough
 Cookie salad
 Corn cookie
 Coyotas
F
 Fattigmann
 Finikia
 Fortune cookie
G
 Gingerbread cookie
 Ginger nut
 Guyuria
H
 Hallongrotta
J
 Jodenkoek
 Jumble
K
 Kichel
 Kleicha
 Koloocheh and Masgati
 Krumkake
 Kuih semperit
M
 Macaron
 Macaroon
 Maple leaf cream cookies
 Moravian spice cookies
 Mustacciuoli
N
 Nanaimo bar
 Nocciolini di Canzo
O
 Oatmeal raisin cookie
P
 Panellets
 Peanut butter cookie
 Pignolo
 Pizzelle
 Polvorón
Q
 Qurabiya
R
 Rainbow cookie
 Reshteh khoshkar
 Rock cake
 Rose Cookies
 Rosette
 Roskette
 Russian tea cake
S
 Sandbakelse
 Silvana
 Snickerdoodle
 Sohan
 Stroopwafel
 Sugar cookie
T
 Teiglach
 Thin Mints
 Tuile
 Tuticorin macaroon
W
 Whoopie pie

Custards
Custard is a variety of culinary preparations based on a cooked mixture of milk or cream and egg yolk. Depending on how much egg or thickener is used, custard may vary in consistency from a thin pouring sauce (crème anglaise) to a thick pastry cream (crème pâtissière) used to fill éclairs. Most common custards are used as desserts or dessert sauces and typically include sugar and vanilla. Custard bases may also be used for quiches and other savory foods. Sometimes flour, corn starch, or gelatin is added as in pastry cream or crème pâtissière.

B
 Banana pudding
 Bavarian cream
 Bean pie
 Berliner
 Bienenstich
 Bob Andy pie
 Boston cream doughnut
 Boston cream pie
 Bougatsa
 Bread and butter pudding
 Buttermilk pie
C
 Charlotte
 Cheesecake
 Chiboust cream
 Clafoutis
 Coconut custard
 Coconut jam
 Cream pie
 Crème anglaise
 Crème brûlée
 Crème caramel
 Custard pie
 Custard tart
E
 Éclair
 Egg tart
F
 Far Breton
 Flanby
 Flapper pie
 Floating island
 Flourless chocolate cake
 Frangipane
 French toast
 Frozen custard
G
 Galaktoboureko
K
 Kissel
 Kogel mogel
 Kremna rezina
 Kremówka
 Krempita
 Krofne
M
 Malvern pudding
 Manchester tart
 Mató de Pedralbes
 Melktert
 Miguelitos
 Mille-feuille
N
 Nanaimo bar
 Natillas
 Neenish tart
 Norman Tart
O
 Ozark pudding
P
 Pączki
 Pastel de nata
 Pio Quinto
 Pot de crème
 Profiterole
 Pudding
 Pumpkin pie
Q
 Queen of Puddings
 Quindim
R
 Rožata
S
 Salzburger Nockerl
 Skolebrød
 Soufflé
 Spotted dick
 St. Honoré cake
 Sweet potato pie
T
 Tarte à la Bouillie
 Tiramisu
 Torta de nata
 Treacle sponge pudding
 Trifle
V
 Vla
W
 Watalappam
Z
 Zabaione
 Zeppole

Dessert sauces

Dessert sauces are used to add flavor and texture to desserts, and tend to be sweet.

C
 Caramel sauce
 Chancaca
 Cherries jubilee
 Chocolate syrup
 Custard
 Crème anglaise
 Crème pâtissière
 Crémeux
D
 Dream Whip
F
 Fruit curd
H
 Hard sauce
L
 Latik
M
 Magic Shell
R
 Rumtopf
S
 Slatko
W
 Wet walnuts

Italian cuisine
 Sauce – dessert sauces

Doughnuts

A doughnut, or donut, is a type of fried dough confectionery or dessert food. The doughnut is popular in many countries and prepared in various forms as a sweet snack that can be homemade or purchased in bakeries, supermarkets, food stalls, and franchised specialty outlets.

A
 Angel wings
 Awwamaat
B
 Bamiyeh
 Baursaki
 Bear claw
 Beignet
 Berliner
 Bombolone
 Boortsog
 Boston cream doughnut
 Brown Bobby
 Buñuelo
C
 Çäkçäk
 Churro
 Cider doughnut
 Coconut doughnut
 Cruller
D
 Dutchie
F
 Fánk
 Fasnacht
 Filhós
 Fried Coke
 Fried dough
 Fritelli
 Fritter
 Frittole
 Fritule
 Funnel cake
G
 Gogoşi
 Gosh-e Fil
I
 Imarti
J
 Jalebi
 Jelly doughnut
K
 Kleina
 Klenät
 Koeksister
 Kreple
 Krofne
L
 Lokma
 Long John
 Loukoumades
 Luther Burger
M
 Mahua
 Malasada
 Maple bacon donut
 Maple bar
N
 Nonnevot
O
 Oliebol
 Ox-tongue pastry
P
 Pączki
 Pastisset
 Pestiños
 Picarones
 Potato doughnut
 Prusurate
 Puff-puff
R
 Rosette
S
 Sabudana vada
 Sata andagi
 Sfenj
 Sgabeo
 Shuangbaotai
 Smultring
 Sopaipilla
 Sour cream doughnut
 Sufganiyah
T
 Timbits
 Toutin
 Tulumba
V
 Vada
Y
 Youtiao
Z
 Zeppole

Frozen desserts
Frozen dessert is the generic name for desserts made by freezing liquids, semi-solids, and sometimes even solids.

A
 Açaí na tigela
B
 Baked Alaska
 Bombe glacée
 Bingsu
C
 Café liégeois
 Cendol
 Creme de papaya
F
 Faloodeh
 Frozen banana
 Frozen custard
 Frozen yogurt
 Frozie cup
G
 Gelato
 Givré
 Granita
 Grattachecca
H
 Halo-halo
 Huckabuck
I
 Ice milk
 Ice buko
 Iskrambol
 Italian ice
K
 Kulfi
M
 Maíz con hielo
 Mellorine
N
 Nam khaeng sai
P
 Paleta
 Patbingsu
 Piragua
 Popsicle
R
 Rainbow sherbet
S
 Semifreddo
 Shave ice
 Shaved ice
 Slush
 Sno-ball
 Snow cone
 Snow cream
 Soft serve
 Sorbet
 Spoom
T
 Tartufo
 Tasaka Guri-Guri
 Tutti frutti
Z
 Zuccotto

Ice cream

Ice cream is a frozen dessert usually made from dairy products, such as milk and cream and often combined with fruits or other ingredients and flavors. Ice cream became popular throughout the world in the second half of the 20th century after cheap refrigeration became common.

A
 Affogato
 Arctic roll
B
 Bacon sundae
 Baked Alaska
 Banana split
 Biscuit Tortoni
 Booza
C
 Choc ice
 Chocolate chip cookie dough ice cream
 Choc-Top
 Coffee cabinet
D
 Dairy mix
 Dame blanche
 Dippin' Dots
 Dondurma
F
 Flame on the iceberg
 Freeze-dried ice cream
 Fried ice cream
G
 Gelato
 Golden Opulence Sundae
I
 Ice cream bar
 Ice cream cake
 Ice cream cone
 Ice cream float
 Ice cream sandwich
 Ice cream soda
 Ice milk
 Indian ice cream (Alaska)
 Indian ice cream (Canada)
K
 Knickerbocker glory
 Kulfi
M
 Milkshake
 Mix-in
 Mochi ice cream
 Monaka
P
 Parfait
 Penny lick
R
 Raspberry Ripple
S
 Screwball
 Snow cream
 Soft serve
 Sorbetes
 Spaghettieis
 Stracciatella
 Sundae
T
 Tin roof pie
 Tutti frutti

Pastries

Pastry is the name given to various kinds of baked products made from ingredients such as flour, sugar, milk, butter, shortening, baking powder, and eggs. Small tarts and other sweet baked products are called "pastries."

A
 Alexandertorte
 Allerheiligenstriezel
 Apple strudel
 Azerbaijani pakhlava
B
 Bakewell pudding
 Baklava
 Bakpia
 Bakpia Pathok
 Bánh pía
 Banitsa
 Banket
 Bear claw
 BeaverTails
 Belekoy
 Belokranjska povitica
 Bethmännchen
 Birnbrot
 Bizcocho
 Blachindla
 Bougatsa
 Boyoz
 Briouat
 Bruttiboni
C
 Carac
 ChaSan
 Chorley cake
 Chouquette
 Choux pastry
 Cinnamon roll
 Coca
 Coussin de Lyon
 Cream horn
 Croline
 Churro
 Cronut
 Cuban pastry
D
 Dabby-Doughs
 Danish pastry
 Djevrek
E
 Eccles cake
 Ensaïmada
F
 Fa gao
 Fazuelos
 Fig roll
 Fish-shaped pastry
 Flaky pastry
 Flaons
 Flies graveyard
 Franzbrötchen
G
 Gâteau Basque
 Gibanica
 Gözleme
 Gundain
 Gyeongju bread
H
 Haddekuche
 Heong Peng
 Honey bun
I
 Inipit
J
 Jachnun
 Jalebi
K
 Kalács
 Kanafeh
 Kitchener bun
 Knieküchle
 Krempita
 Kringle
 Kroštule
 Kürtőskalács
L
 Lattice
 Leipziger Lerche
 London Cheesecake
M
 Ma'amoul
 Makroudh
 Malsouka
 Mandelkubb
 Mantecadas
 Marillenknödel
 Masan
 Miguelitos
 Milhoja
 Milk-cream strudel
 Mooncake
 Moorkop
N
 Nǎiyóu sū bǐng
 Nun's puffs
P
 Pan dulce
 Papanași
 Pastel
 Pastry heart
 Phyllo
 Pineapple cake
 Pionono
 Plăcintă
 Pretzel
 Profiterole
 Puff pastry
 Punsch-roll
 Punschkrapfen
Q
 Qottab
 Quesito
R
 Rab cake
 Remonce
 Roti tissue
 Roze koek
 Runeberg's torte
S
 Sad cake
 Schnecken
 Schneeball
 Semla
 Shortcrust pastry
 Şöbiyet
 Sou
 Spanisch Brötli
 Spritzkuchen
 Streusel
 Strudel
 Stutenkerl
 Suncake
 Sufganiyah
 Sweetheart cake
T
 Tahini roll
 Toaster pastry
 Torpedo dessert
 Tortell
 Tortita negra
 Tu
 Turnover
U
 Uštipci
 Utap
V
 Vatrushka
 Vetkoek
 Vol-au-vent
W
Y
 Yurla
Z
 Zeeuwse bolus
 Žemlovka

Pastries with poppy seeds

 Chatti Pathiri
 Hamantash
 Kifli
 Kolach
 Kołacz
 Kūčiukai
 Nunt
 Nut roll
 Poppy seed roll
 Prekmurska gibanica
 Rugelach

Pies

A pie is a baked dish which is usually made of a pastry dough casing that covers or completely contains a filling of various sweet or savoury ingredients.

Sweet pies

A
 Apple pie
B
 Bakewell tart
 Banoffee pie
 Bean pie
 Bedfordshire clanger
 Black bun
 Blackberry pie
 Blueberry pie
 Bob Andy pie
 Buko pie
 Bumbleberry pie
 Buttermilk pie
C
 Cherry pie
 Chess pie
 Cobbler
 Cookie Cake Pie
 Cream pie
 Custard pie
 Custard tart
D
 Derby pie
F
 Flapper pie
 Fried pie
G
 Grape pie
K
 Key lime pie
 Kuchen
L
 Lemon ice box pie
 Lemon meringue pie
M
 Manchester tart
 Mince pie
 Mississippi mud pie
P
 Pecan pie
 Pirog
 Pumpkin pie
R
 Razzleberry
 Rhubarb pie
 Rijstevlaai
 Rönttönen
S
 Saskatoonberry pie
 Shaker Lemon Pie
 Shoofly pie
 Smulpaj
 Snickers pie
 Strawberry pie
 Strawberry rhubarb pie
 Sugar pie
 Sugar cream pie
 Sweet potato pie
T
 Tarta de Santiago
 Treacle tart
V
 Vlaai

Tarts

A tart is a baked dish consisting of a filling over a pastry base with an open top not covered with pastry. The pastry is usually shortcrust pastry; the filling may be sweet or savory, though modern tarts are usually fruit-based, sometimes with custard.

 Bakewell tart
 Butter tart
 Caramel tart
 Charlotte
 Chocolate tart
 Conversation tart
 Crostata
 Custard tart
 Egg tart
 Gizzada
 Gypsy tart
 Lemon tart
 Manchester tart
 Melktert
 Neenish tart
 Norman Tart
 Pastel de nata
 Pineapple tart
 Quetschentaart
 Rhubarb tart
 Tarte à la Bouillie
 Tarte Tatin
 Treacle tart

Puddings

Pudding is usually a dessert, but it can also be a savory dish. In the United Kingdom and most Commonwealth countries, pudding can be used to describe both sweet and savory dishes. However, unless qualified, the term in everyday usage typically denotes a dessert. In the United States and Canada, pudding characteristically denotes a sweet milk-based dessert similar in consistency to egg-based custards, instant custards or a mousse.

A
 Ábrystir
 Almond jelly
 Ashure
 Asida
B
 Bakewell pudding
 Banana pudding
 Bánh chuối
 Bebinca
 Blancmange
 Blodpalt
 Bread pudding
 Brown Betty
C
 Capirotada
 Carrot pudding
 Chè
 Cheese pudding
 Chocolate biscuit pudding
 Chocolate pudding
 Christmas pudding
 Clootie
 Cottage Pudding
D
 Diplomat pudding
 Dutch baby pancake
F
 Figgy duff
 Flummadiddle
 Flummery
 Fruit pudding
 Frumenty
G
 Goody
 Götterspeise
H
 Hasty pudding
 Haupia
 Herrencreme
J
 Junket
K
 Kalamai
 Kirschenmichel
 Kulolo
 Kutia
M
 Malva pudding
 Mango pudding
 Monmouth Pudding
P
 Panna cotta
 Persimmon pudding
 Pistachio pudding
 Po'e
 Put chai ko
R
 Rice pudding
 Rødgrød
 Rømmegrøt
 Rožata
S
 Sago pudding
 Semolina pudding
T
 Tapioca pudding
 Tembleque
W
 Welf pudding

By country

Algeria
 Khobz Mbesses

Argentina

Australia

 Anzac biscuit
 Chocolate crackles
 Frog cake
 Hedgehog slice
 Icebox cake
 Jelly slice
 Lamington
 Neenish tart
 Pavlova
 White Christmas

Azerbaijan 

 Azerbaijani pakhlava
 Badambura
 Shekerbura
 Shorgoghali

Bangladesh

Bosnia and Herzegovina

 Tufahija

Brazil

 Açaí na tigela
 Beijinho
 Bolo de rolo
 Brigadeiro
 Cajuzinho
 Canjica
 Creme de papaya
 Cuajada
 Curau
 Goiabada
 Manjar branco
 Maria-mole
 Paçoca
 Pamonha
 Papo-de-anjo
 Pé-de-moleque
 Quindim

Bulgaria

Canada

 BeaverTails
 Butter tart
 Nanaimo bar
 Persian
 Pouding chômeur
 Saskatoonberry pie
 Sugar pie

Chile
 Chilean cuisine – Sweets, cakes, and desserts

 Kuchen
 Mote con huesillo
 Murta con membrillo

China

Czech Republic
 Kolach
 Míša

Finland
 Finnish cuisine – Desserts

France

Germany

 Brenntar

Greece

 Bougatsa
 Diples
 Dondurma
 Finikia
 Galaktoboureko
 Koulourakia
 Loukoumades
 Melomakarono
 Moustalevria
 Nougat
 Qurabiya
 Sesame seed candy
 Spoon sweets
 Tahinopita
 Vasilopita

Hong Kong

 Egg tart
 Eggette
 Mango pomelo sago
 Put chai ko

Hungary

 Angel wings
 Apple strudel
 Buchteln
 Dobos torte
 Esterházy torte
 Fánk
 Floating island
 Gugelhupf
 Kalács
 Kürtőskalács
 Linzer torte
 Makówki
 Milk-cream strudel
 Poppy seed roll
 Rigó Jancsi
 Rum ball
 Strudel
 Vanillekipferl

India

Indonesia

 Bubur kacang hijau
 Bubur ketan hitam
 Cendol
 Corn cookie
 Es campur
 Es doger
 Es teler
 Grass jelly
 Klappertaart
 Kolak
 Lupis
 Nata de coco

Iran

 Abnabat
 Bastani
 Faloodeh
  Gaz (candy)
 Halva
 Kolompeh
 Koloocheh
 Komaj sehen
 Noghl
 Pashmak
 Qottab
 Sholezard
 Yazdi cake

Italy

Italian pastries

 Baicoli
 Beignet
 Biscotti
 Biscotti Regina
 Bocconotto
 Bombolone
 Cannoli
 Ciarduna
 Crocetta di Caltanissetta
 Meringa
 Panettone
 Pandoro
 Pevarini
 Pignolata
 Pignolo
 Pizzelle
 Sfogliatelle
 Struffoli
 Torta Barozzi
 Torta caprese
 Zeppole

Japan

Korea

Luxembourg
 Quetschentaart

Malaysia
 Batik cake
 Bubur cha cha
 Sarawak layer cake
 Ais kacang
 Cendol
 Bubur Kacang

Mexico
 List of Mexican dishes – Desserts and sweets

 Alfajor
 Bionico
 Buñuelo
 Cajeta
 Capirotada
 Cocadas
 Coyotas
 Fried ice cream
 Manjar blanco
 Marzipan
 Nicuatole
 Paleta
 Rice pudding
 Rosca de reyes
 Tres leches cake

Netherlands
 Dutch cuisine – Desserts and puddings

New Zealand

Afghan biscuit
Anzac biscuit
Fairy bread
Hokey pokey
Lolly cake
Pavlova

Pakistan

Peru 
 Picarones
 Turrón de Doña Pepa
 Suspiro a la limeña
 Mazamorra morada

Philippines

Poland

Portugal 
 Aletria
 Baba de Camelo 
 Bola de Berlim 
 Bolo de arroz 
 Bolo de mel
 Bolo Rainha
 Filhós
 Fios de ovos
 Malasada
 Natas do Céu
 Ovos Moles
 Pão de ló
 Pastel de Nata
 Queijada
 Rabanadas

Romania

 Clătită
 Colivă
 Colțunași
 Cozonac
 Griş cu lapte
 Halva
 Lapte de pasăre
 Magiun of Topoloveni
 Pască
 Rahat
 Scovardă
 Sfințișori
 Ștrudel

Romanian pastries

 Alivenci
 Amandine
 Cornuleţe
 Gogoşi
 Joffre cake
 Papanași
 Plăcintă

Russia

 Blini
 Charlotte
 Halva
 Khvorost
 Guriev porridge
 Kogel mogel
 Napoleon
 Oladyi
 Pastila
 Ponchiki
 Ptichye moloko
 Sushki
 Syrniki
 Tula pryanik
 Varenye
 Vatrushka
 Zefir

Slovenia

 Belokranjska povitica
 Funšterc
 Gugelhupf
 Kremna rezina
 Nut roll
 Pinca
 Prekmurska gibanica
 Strudel

Spain

 Arroz con leche
 Casadiella
 Fartons
 Leche frita
 Pantxineta
 Sobao
 Tecula mecula
 Torrija
 Xuixo
 Yemas de Santa Teresa
 Crema catalana
 Mató de Pedralbes
 Menjablanc
 Mel i mató
 Carquinyoli
 Catànies
 coques
 bunyols
 Panellet
 Tortell
 Torró
 Neules

Sri Lanka

Switzerland

Swiss pastries

 Blue cake
 Bündner Nusstorte

Syria

 Baklava
 Barazek
 Galaktoboureko
 Halawet el Jibn
 Knafeh
 Qatayef
 Rice pudding

Taiwan

 Aiyu jelly
 Bubble tea
 Bàobīng
 Pineapple cake
 Suncake
 Taro ball

Thailand

 Cendol
 Coconut custard
 Foi thong
 Grass jelly
 Khanom khrok
 Khanom bueang
 Khanom chan
 Khanom thuai
 Khao tom
 Kluay buat chee
 Mango sticky rice
 Namtan pan
 Thong yip
 Tub tim krob

Turkey

Turkish pastries

 Baklava
 Bülbül yuvası
 Cezerye
 Ekmek kadayıfı
 Güllaç
 Kalburabastı
 Künefe
 Kurabiye
 Lady's navel
 Lokma
 Revani
 Sambali
 Saray helva
 Şekerpare
 Sütlü Nuriye
 Tulumba

Ukraine

 Babka
 Mlynzi
 Plyazky
 Kyiv cake
 Lviv syrnyk
 Napoleon
 Oladky
 Pampuhy
 Medivnyk (honey cake)
 Syrnyky
 Varenyky
 Vypichka
 Verhuny
 Zefir

United Arab Emirates
 Khabees

United Kingdom

Scotland

 Abernethy biscuit
 Black bun
 Clootie
 Cranachan
 Deep-fried Mars bar
 Dundee cake
 Empire biscuit
 Fudge doughnut
 Penguin
 Tipsy Laird

United States

Uruguay

 Berliner

Vietnam

 Bánh bao bánh vạc
 Bánh bò
 Bánh chuối
 Bánh da lợn
 Bánh gối
 Bánh in
 Bánh lá / Bánh tẻ
 Bánh phu thê
 Bánh pía
 Bánh rán
 Chè
 Chè trôi nước
 Cơm rượu
 Mango sticky rice

By region

Indian Subcontinent

Bengal
 Bengali cuisine – desserts

Latin America
Latin America is a highly diverse area with cuisines that vary from nation to nation. Desserts in Latin American cuisine include, rice pudding, tres leches cake, teja and flan.

Polynesia
 Po'e
 Poi

Southern Africa
In Southern Africa, desserts may simply be fruit, but there are some western style puddings, such as the Angolan cocada amarela, which was inspired by Portuguese cuisine.

By time period

Middle Ages
 Medieval cuisine – sweets and desserts

See also

 Cuisine
 Culinary art
 Dessert-related lists (category)
 List of bean-to-bar chocolate manufacturers
 List of breads
 List of custard desserts
 List of dessert sauces
 List of ice cream flavors

References

Further reading

 

 
Desserts
Desserts